The City of Playford Tennis International is a professional tennis tournament played on outdoor hard courts. It is currently part of the ATP Challenger Tour and the International Tennis Federation (ITF) Women's Circuit. It is held annually at the Playford City Tennis Centre in Playford, Australia, since 2018. The men's event replaces the City of Onkaparinga ATP Challenger held from 2015 until 2017.

Past finals

Men's singles

Women's singles

Men's doubles

Women's doubles

References

External links
Official website

ATP Challenger Tour
ITF Women's World Tennis Tour
Hard court tennis tournaments
Tennis tournaments in Australia
Recurring sporting events established in 2018
2018 establishments in Australia